Hans Kuhn (13 July 1899 – 8 October 1988) was a German philologist who specialized in Germanic studies. He was Professor of Nordic philology at the University of Kiel.

Biography
Hans Kuhn was born in Minden, Germany on 13 July 1899. After gaining his PhD, Kuhn initially worked as a high school teacher. He completed his habilitation under the supervision of Karl Helm in 1931 at the University of Marburg, where he subsequently lectured for several years.

Kuhn was a professor at the University of Leipzig from 1938 to 1941, and a professor at the University of Berlin from 1941 to 1946. He was elected a Member of the Prussian Academy of Sciences in 1943.

From 1946 to 1964, Kuhn was Professor of Nordic Philology at the University of Kiel. In 1959, Kuhn gained much attention for his proposal that there existed a Nordwestblock in the area around the lower Rhine in the Iron Age, which was neither Celtic or Germanic. He was also the author of numerous works on Old Norse literature. Prominent students of Kuhn at the University of Kiel include Klaus von See and Dietrich Hofmann.

Selected works
 Das Füllwort of-um im Altwestnordischen,  1929
 Island. Das Heimatland der Sagas, 1935
 Vor- und frühgermanische Ortsnamen in Norddeutschland und den Niederlanden, 1959
 (with Rolf Hachmann and Georg Kossack): Völker zwischen Germanen und Kelten, 1962
 Grenzen vor- und frühgeschichtlicher Ortsnamentypen, 1963
 Kleine Schriften, 1969-1978
 Das alte Island, 1971
 Das Dróttkvætt, 1983
 Das altnordische Seekriegswesen, 1991

See also
 Andreas Heusler

Sources

 Deutsche Biographische Enzyklopädie. Vol. 6: K. Saur, München 1997, .
 Wolfgang Meid: Hans Kuhns „Nordwestblock“-Hypothese. Zur Problematik der „Völker zwischen Germanen und Kelten“. In: Heinrich Beck (Hrsg.): Germanenprobleme in heutiger Sicht. de Gruyter, Berlin u. a. 1986, S. 183–212
 

1899 births
1988 deaths
Etymologists
German non-fiction writers
German philologists
Germanic studies scholars
Germanists
Academic staff of the Humboldt University of Berlin
Linguists of Germanic languages
Linguists from Germany
Old Norse studies scholars
People from Minden
University of Basel alumni
University of Marburg alumni
Academic staff of the University of Marburg
Academic staff of the University of Kiel
Academic staff of Leipzig University
20th-century linguists
20th-century non-fiction writers
20th-century philologists